Janice Trombly (born January 6, 1957) is an American former handball player who competed in the 1984 Summer Olympics. Apart from handball, Trombly played basketball and won gold with the American team at the 1979 FIBA World Championship for Women.

References

1957 births
Living people
American female handball players
Olympic handball players of the United States
Handball players at the 1984 Summer Olympics
21st-century American women
Pan American Games silver medalists for the United States
Medalists at the 1979 Pan American Games
Pan American Games medalists in handball